De Roo is a Dutch surname meaning "the red (haired) one" (de rode in modern Dutch). It is often concatenated to DeRoo in French and West Flanders.

People with this surname include:

De Roo
Alain De Roo (born 1955), Belgian racing cyclist
 (born 1955), Dutch politician
Benjamin de Roo (1940–2016), Dutch-born Australian gymnast
 (1793-1880), Belgian nobility, politician, and magistrate
Jo de Roo (born 1937), Dutch road racing cyclist
Joseph De Roo (1932-2001), Belgian translator of Japanese
Peter de Roo (born 1970), Dutch footballer
Remi De Roo (born 1924), Canadian Roman Catholic bishop
 (born 1970), Belgian actress

DeRoo
 Antoon Emeric Marcel De Roo (1936-1971), Belgian naturalist after whom Deroo's mouse was named.
Dave DeRoo (born 1974), American rock bassist
David DeRoo (born 1985), French road racing cyclist
Sam Deroo (born 1992), Belgian volleyball player

See also
De Roo van Alderwerelt, Dutch patrician family
De Rooij, surname of the same origin
Roe (surname), with English and Scottish variants Roe or Roo (south), and Rae or Ray (north), meaning "a female deer"

References

Dutch-language surnames

de:De Roo
fr:Deroo